Encounters with Civilizations: From Alexander the Great to Mother Teresa  (Transaction Publishers, New Brunswick, US; London, UK, 2011), by Gëzim Alpion, explores people’s experience and tensions of dealing with civilizations and cultures different from their own. The fifteen texts cover Albania, Egypt, the United Kingdom and India, and explore how these countries have been shaped by different cultures. In an age of mass communication and global migration the book raises important issues about citizenship, multiculturalism and integration.

About the author 
Alpion is an academic, political analyst, writer, playwright, and essayist. He holds a BA from Cairo University and a PhD from Durham University, UK. He is currently based in the Department of Sociology at the University of Birmingham, UK. Stephen Schwartz holds that Alpion is 'a pioneer in the academic study of the phenomenon of celebrity', and ‘the most authoritative English-language author on Blessed Teresa of Kolkata'. 
In addition to Encounters with Civilizations: From Alexander the Great to Mother Teresa, Gëzim Alpion's main publications to date include Foreigner Complex: Essays and Fiction about Egypt (2002), Mother Teresa: Saint or Celebrity? (2007), and If Only the Dead Could Listen (2008).

The fifteen texts are selected and introduced by Canadian-born scholar Gaston Roberge. Professor Roberge teaches film and communication at St. Xavier's College, Kolkata, India. He has written eighteen books, one of which Communication Cinema Development, won an award at the National Film Festival of India in 1999.

Overview 
Encounters with Civilizations is a broad-ranging work, uniting sweeping themes such as history, culture, the media, social issues, and politics. Building around comparative analyses of aspects of Albanian, Egyptian, British, and Indian cultures, in this collection of thirteen texts written between 1993 and 2007, Alpion addresses the problems people experience in their encounters with civilizations different from their birth cultures. The course of history has made the confrontation and comingling of different cultures inevitable. It has also engendered ambivalence toward the cultures involved, including a desire to emulate the new culture, or resentment, or conflicting attitudes toward the relative strength or weakness of both birth and new cultures.

Alpion describes how Egyptian culture and politics have been shaped by foreign domination while retaining ancient customs at the social level. In comparison, Great Britain has been an imperial power whose cultural preeminence has shaped the images of smaller countries in the eyes of the world. Alpion writes of English images of his native Albania and offers a penetrating analysis of Mother Teresa as a Christian missionary in Hindu and Muslim India, focusing on her cultural presentation via the media and the cult of celebrity.

Whether discussing the customs of Egyptian coffee houses or Alexander the Great as a defining figure in Western and Eastern culture, Alpion grasps the impact of these cultural encounters. He makes us aware that understanding and resolving such differences involves considering ultimate issues of life and death. Alpion contends that ‘Civilizations can co-exist, but not if some are written off as footnotes while others impose themselves as the norm’.

Editions 

The book was first published by Meteor Books in India in 2008. The first American edition was issued by Globic Press in 2009. The second US edition was published by Transaction Publishers in 2011.

Praise for the pook
Here is a selection of quotes from reviews of Encounters with Civilizations:

‘Like all good sociologists Alpion illuminates the core of a society through an analysis of its margins... Alpion offers us a view of the other that is not embittered or destructive but ultimately positive and challenging.’

Professor Brian Shoesmith, Edith Cowan University
Continuum: Journal of Media & Cultural Studies, Perth, Australia

‘One of the main theses of the book is that there is, especially in academia, an inbuilt discrimination and injustice against countries outside the First World, and that Albania and other East European nations suffer the same or similar discrimination as West Asian Islamic countries, and the African and Asian continents... The book is therefore a collection of 13 significant sociological and historical articles relay[ing] a voice from the margins that comes from inside the geography at times wrongly considered to be uniformly the “rich world”’.

Professor George Gispert-Sauch 
Journal of Theological Reflection, New Delhi, India

‘The author does take up certain controversial issues in the book. The volume argues for cross-cultural understanding and co-existence of civilizations. It gives the message to people across civilizations to embrace the “other” without prejudice.’

P. K. Pabla, International Journal on Humanistic Ideology, Romania

‘Reminiscent of Durkheim’s writings on strangers in places, Encounters with Civilizations, covers centuries and cultures both past and present... [Alpion] encourages us to think reflectively and critically about our own beliefs, experiences and understandings, and thus helps to open up the possibility for change and the encounters with “civilizations” (others and our own) that we experience daily, either personally or through the media.’

Dr Claire Smetherham, University of Bristol, UK
Albanian Journal of Politics, Chapel Hill, NC, USA

‘[Encounters with Civilizations] deals with history, culture, the media, social issues and politics... [and] is prompted by Dr Alpion’s ongoing reflection on the problems people experience in their encounters with civilizations different from theirs. Thus, these texts pertain to philosophy... One may not always agree with Dr Alpion’s opinions, but one can never discard them. One is challenged, whatever the place one happens to live in.’

Professor Gaston Roberge, Introduction to Encounters with Civilizations, India

‘Alpion looks very insightfully into the ways in which so many, particularly those of religious and political groups and the media, have distorted the life and work of Mother Teresa, not least Malcolm Muggeridge in his “discovery” of her in 1968.’

Antonia Young, Colgate University, New York, USA & University of Bradford, UK
Central & Eastern European Review Journal, UK

‘Two important behavioural traits appear throughout the book and the author has taken considerable pains to weave the manifestations of these traits in each of the locales presented in the book. These are “foreigner complex” and “social closure”... The book has important messages for those wishing to seek their futures on foreign soil.’

Professor Bonita Aleaz, Head of Department of Political Science, University of Calcutta
The Statesman, India

‘Globalization has brought an increased awareness of the interconnectedness of cultures, while a historical awareness shows the hubris involved in any presumption of a privileged centre. Dr Gëzim Alpion is the ideal companion in travels across and within cultures. He brings a sensitive humanism and the eye of an acute scholar to address diverse issues of cross-cultural understanding in divided worlds. These essays will be necessary reading.’

Professor John Holmwood, University of Nottingham, UK

‘This book provides further proof that Professor Gëzim Alpion is one of the most intelligent and acute observers in the world of the situation of Albanian culture and its most famous modern representative, Mother Teresa. His work is destined to be controversial but should be read as widely as possible, and his book Mother Teresa: Saint or Celebrity? will, I believe, prove a standard and indispensable resource.’
Stephen Schwartz
Author of Two Faces of Islam, Washington, D.C., USA

‘[Alpion] seeks to do on paper what Mohammed Ali did in politics: release Egypt from the psychosis of its national inferiority complex, restore its nationhood, and revive Egypt for the Egyptians. And in Foreigner Complex he comes closer to depicting the essence of five thousand years of Egyptian identity than a thousand newspaper despatches from Cairo.’

Nicolas Pelham, former editor of The Middle East Times &
current Jerusalem correspondent for The Economist

Reviews 
This is a select list of reviews of Encounters with Civilizations
 Aleaz, B., The Statesman (Calcutta), 27 April 2008, p. 17.
 Gispert-Sauch, G., Journal of Theological Reflection, Vol. 76, No. 1, January 2012, pp. 79–80.
 Pabla, P. K., International Journal on Humanistic Ideology, Vol. 2, Issue 2, Autumn - Winter 2009, pp. 179–182.
 Paul, C. M., Review for The Herald Weekly, (Calcutta, India) June 2012.
 Roberge, R., Albanian Journal of Politics (Chapel Hill, NC, USA: Globic Press), .Vol. 3, Issue 2, December 2007, pp. 176–179.
 Schwartz, S., ‘How we speak of Mother Teresa...’, Folks Magazine (New Delhi, India), 9 January 2012.
 Shoesmith, B., Continuum: Journal of Media & Cultural Studies, Vol. 24, Issue 2, 2010, pp. 323–325.
 Smetherham, C., Albanian Journal of Politics, Vol. 4, Issue 2, December 2008, pp. 126–128.
 Young, A., Central & Eastern European Review Journal, Vol. 2, September 2008, pp. 104–107.

References 

Transaction Publishers books
English non-fiction books
American non-fiction books
Indian non-fiction books
2011 non-fiction books
2008 non-fiction books
21st-century Indian books